The niutuiqin (牛腿琴), or niubatui (牛巴腿), is a traditional Chinese bowed string instrument. It is a two-stringed fiddle and is used by the Dong people of Guizhou.

See also 
 Chinese music
 List of Chinese musical instruments
 Huqin

References

Chinese musical instruments
Culture in Guizhou
Huqin family instruments